Dweller on the Threshold may refer to:
Guardian of the Threshold, an esoteric figure
Dweller at the Threshold, an American electronic music band active from 1993 to 2005
"Dweller on the Threshold", a 1982 song by Van Morrison
Dweller on the Threshold, a 2006 album by Tribe of Gypsies
"Dweller on the Threshold", a 1993 song by Joe Satriani on his album Time Machine
Dwellers on the Threshold, a 2002 album by Tarwater
Dweller on the Threshold, a concept in the mystery TV series Twin Peaks